The Chapel of St. Ignatius is a Jesuit chapel on the Seattle University campus in the U.S. state of Washington, completed in 1997. The design earned Steven Holl Architects a Twenty-five Year Award from the American Institute of Architects. A scale model of the building is in the permanent collection of the Museum of Modern Art in New York City.

Holl described his design for the chapel as "seven bottles of light in a stone box," with daylight taking on color by bouncing off colored baffles and passing through colored glass lenses. The same occurs in reverse at night, with light emanating from the building's internal illumination taking on color from the same mechanisms.

Although Holl's conception is rooted in the theology of St. Ignatius, Seattle journalist and critic Charles Mudede has described the building as "more spiritual than Christian," and has written that it is "hard to pray" there because "all one wants to do is look at the pretty lights pouring through skylights and colored windows… As at Ronchamp, the architect, not God, is worshiped in this box with bottles of light."

References

External links 

 
 Chapel of St. Ignatius at Seattle University

1997 establishments in Washington (state)
Buildings and structures completed in 1997
Buildings and structures in Seattle
Chapels in the United States
Seattle University campus